is a Japanese boxer. He competed in the men's lightweight event at the 2016 Summer Olympics.

References

External links
 

1989 births
Living people
Japanese male boxers
Olympic boxers of Japan
Boxers at the 2016 Summer Olympics
People from Kumamoto Prefecture
Sportspeople from Kumamoto Prefecture
Boxers at the 2018 Asian Games
Asian Games bronze medalists for Japan
Asian Games medalists in boxing
Medalists at the 2018 Asian Games
Lightweight boxers
Boxers at the 2020 Summer Olympics